Take My Hand may refer to:

 "Take My Hand" (Dido song), 1999
 "Take My Hand" (Lastlings song), 2020
 "Take My Hand", a 2022 song by 5 Seconds of Summer
 "Take My Hand", a song by Charli XCX from her 2013 album True Romance
 "Take My Hand", a song by Hatchie from their 2022 album Giving the World Away
 "Take My Hand", a song by Simple Plan from their 2008 album Simple Plan
 "Take My Hand”, a season three episode of The Good Doctor

See also
 
 
 Hold My Hand (disambiguation)